Under Construction, Part II is the third studio album released by hip hop duo Timbaland & Magoo. It was released by Blackground and Universal on November 18, 2003, in the United States. The group's third album and Timbaland's fourth overall LP, as he issued Tim's Bio: Life from da Bassment, a solo album, in 1998, Under Construction Part II is nominally a sequel to Missy Elliott's fourth studio album Under Construction, which was also chiefly produced by Timbaland. The album was dedicated to R&B singer and regular Timbaland collaborator Aaliyah, who had died on August 25, 2001.

Elliott appears on the album's lead single, "Cop That Shit. Many other guest stars, from Brandy to Sebastian, Bubba Sparxxx, Wyclef Jean and Beenie Man, also appear on the album. Three singles were released from Under Construction, Part II: "Cop That Shit", "Indian Flute", and the promotional single "Naughty Eye". In August 2021, Blackground rebranded as Blackground 2.0, with Barry Hankerson remaining as founder. Blackground 2.0 signed a distribution deal with Empire Distribution, which will re-release the label's catalogue onto digital download sites and streaming services. Under Construction, Part II was rereleased on August 27, 2021.

Critical reception

AllMusic editor John Bush found that "there aren't quite enough guest features or catchy hooks to make this a must-purchase for most rap fans, but Timbaland always has a few tricks up his sleeve." He remarked that "aside from Missy and Bubba Sparxxx, Timba's actually the best rapper on display, much improved from his previous solo shots or his infrequent rhymes on other artists' records. Magoo is still an unimaginative, pint-sized Snoop Dogg." Ben Sisario from Blender felt that "for the most part, the grooves ride low and easy, like a next-generation G-funk transplanted to the Virginia coastline: Call it V-funk [...] But Timbaland can't rest that easy, and just beneath the languid surface is effortlessly brilliant innovation in every direction."

Robert Christgau wrote: "Good thing the two rappers have less personality combined than any of their 10-cameo-artists-in-16-tracks, because personality would distract from the beats, which with Timbo means what it says – no mainstream DJ relies so heavily on rhythm instruments per se. His sweetener of choice is chants."
In a negative review, Rolling Stones Jon Caramanica called Under Construction, Part II the "duo's third and weakest collaborative album." He remarked that "Tim's normally dazzling beats dodder along harmlessly, proof that he's looking over his shoulder when he should be hunching over his studio equipment."

Track listing

Sample credits
 "Cop That Shit" contains re-sung elements from "I Know You Got Soul," written by E. Barrier and W. Griffin, and "Paper Thin," as written by L. Moorer and F. Byrd.
 "Indian Flute" contains an uncredited sample of "Curura" by Toto la Momposina.

Charts

References

2003 albums
Magoo (rapper) albums
Timbaland albums
Albums produced by Timbaland
Sequel albums
Universal Records albums